The Journal of Epidemiology and Community Health is a peer-reviewed public health journal that covers all aspects of epidemiology and public health. It is published by the BMJ Group.

History 
The journal was founded in 1947 by John Ryle, a highly respected physician who was regarded as "one of the most distinguished figures in contemporary medicine" for his time, and has been published under various titles. Former titles are:
1947–1952: British Journal of Social Medicine
1953–1977: British Journal of Preventive and Social Medicine
1978: Journal of Epidemiology and Community Health
March 1979: Epidemiology and Community Health
June 1979–present: Journal of Epidemiology and Community Health

Context of Social Medicine in 1947 

The journal began published its first issue in London in January 1947 under its original name, the British Journal of Social Medicine. The journal's current mission is to be "a truly international journal that encompasses all aspects of epidemiology and public health" which seems fairly commonplace in today's world of globalized journals but given its beginnings in the aftermath of World War II and start of the Cold War era, the emergence of this new journal and its mission is impressive. Social medicine as a field of study had not been well respected since before World War I began due to leading social medicine researchers associating their work with racial hygiene theories so introducing a journal using this specific terminology was a bold move in itself. Creating a new journal focused on international social health during a period of high political and military tension across nations furthered the statement the journal was trying to make – social medicine is important and needs attention beyond country lines.

Abstracting and indexing 
The journal is abstracted and indexed by MEDLINE/PubMed and Current Contents. The journal has a 2019 impact factor of 3.342.

References

External links 
 

Epidemiology journals
English-language journals
BMJ Group academic journals
Publications established in 1947
Monthly journals